Sinogastromyzon wui is a species of ray-finned fish in the genus Sinogastromyzon. It is endemic to southern China including Hainan. It grows to  SL and  TL.

References

Sinogastromyzon
Freshwater fish of China
Endemic fauna of China
Taxa named by Fang Ping-Wen
Fish described in 1930